Fumiko Furuhashi (born 22 April 1959) is a Japanese former professional tennis player.

Furuhashi, the 1980 All-Japan singles champion, represented her country in a total of five Federation Cup ties. She competed for Japan at the 1981 Summer Universiade and won a silver medal in the women's doubles event.

See also
List of Japan Fed Cup team representatives

References

External links
 
 
 

1959 births
Living people
Japanese female tennis players
Medalists at the 1981 Summer Universiade
Universiade silver medalists for Japan
Universiade medalists in tennis
20th-century Japanese women
21st-century Japanese women